Ephydra is a genus of flies belonging to the family Ephydridae.

The genus has cosmopolitan distribution.

Species
Ephydra acrostichalis Malloch, 1925
Ephydra acutata Hu & Yang, 2002
Ephydra afghanica Dahl, 1961
Ephydra alandica Frey, 1909
Ephydra attica Becker, 1896
Ephydra auripes Aldrich, 1912
Ephydra basilaris Waltl, 1837
Ephydra bivittata Loew, 1860
Ephydra breva Hu & Yang, 2002
Ephydra brevis (Walker, 1858)
Ephydra bruesi Cresson, 1934
Ephydra currani Wirth, 1971
Ephydra dorsala Hu & Yang, 2002
Ephydra flavipes (Macquart, 1843)
Ephydra glauca Meigen, 1830
Ephydra goedeni Wirth, 1971
Ephydra gracilis Packard, 1871
Ephydra heijingensis Hu & Yang, 2002
Ephydra hejingensis Hu & Yang, 2002
Ephydra hians Say, 1830
Ephydra japonica Miyagi, 1966
Ephydra lata (Walker, 1858)
Ephydra macellaria Egger, 1862
Ephydra magadiensis Wirth, 1975
Ephydra mexicana Cresson, 1934
Ephydra millbrae Jones, 1906
Ephydra murina Wirth, 1975
Ephydra nana (Walker, 1858)
Ephydra niveiceps Cresson, 1916
Ephydra novae-zealandiae Tonnoir & Malloch, 1926
Ephydra obscuripes Loew, 1866
Ephydra ochrostoma Brullé, 1833
Ephydra opaca Loew, 1856
Ephydra orichalcea Gimmerthal, 1847
Ephydra packardi Wirth, 1971
Ephydra pectinulata Cresson, 1916
Ephydra pseudomurina Krivosheina, 1983
Ephydra riparia Fallén, 1813
Ephydra scholtzi Becker, 1896
Ephydra shalatinensis El-Moursy, Negm, El-Hawagry & Ebrahim, 2006
Ephydra similis Tonnoir & Malloch, 1926
Ephydra stuckenbergi Wirth, 1975
Ephydra subopaca Loew, 1864
Ephydra thermophila Cresson, 1934
Ephydra tibetensis Cresson, 1934
Ephydra urmiana Gunther, 1899
Ephydra usingeri Wirth, 1976
Ephydra yangi Hu & Yang, 2002

References

Ephydridae
Brachycera genera
Taxa named by Carl Fredrik Fallén